Distillery Farm Meadows is an 18.7 hectare biological Site of Special Scientific Interest in Wiltshire, notified in 1988.

The site is managed as a nature reserve by Wiltshire Wildlife Trust.

Sources
 Natural England citation sheet for the site (accessed 24 March 2022)

External links
 Ravensroost Wood including Avis, Distillery and Warbler Meadows - Wiltshire Wildlife Trust
 Natural England website (SSSI information)

Sites of Special Scientific Interest in Wiltshire
Sites of Special Scientific Interest notified in 1988
Wiltshire Wildlife Trust reserves
Meadows in Wiltshire